Roti bolen is Indonesian baked bread pastry with crust layers similar to those of croissant, baked flour with butter or margarine layers, filled with cheese and banana. Other variants uses durian fillings. The cake demonstrate European pastry influences.

See also

Cuisine of Indonesia
Kue
List of Indonesian desserts
List of Indonesian dishes
List of Indonesian snacks

References

Indonesian breads
Kue
Indonesian pastries